Diacrotricha lanceatus is a moth of the family Pterophoridae. It is known from Oman, Saudi Arabia and Yemen.

References

Pterophorini
Moths of the Arabian Peninsula
Moths described in 1986